Wolle is a German surname meaning "wool". Notable people with the surname include:

Charles R. Wolle (1935–2022), American jurist from Iowa; former federal judge of the U. S. district court.
Christian Jacob Wolle (1788–1863), American plant collector and innkeeper.
Gertrud Wolle (1891–1952), German film actress
Muriel Sibell Wolle (1898–1977), American artist; known for paintings of mining communities
William D. Wolle (born 1928), American foreign service officer and ambassador
 Robert H. Wolle, Sr. (born 1924), American environmentalist and public health pioneer

German-language surnames